Christian Parenti is an American investigative journalist, academic, and author.

Early life and education 
Parenti is the son of Michael Parenti and Susan Parenti. He attended Buxton School in Williamstown, Massachusetts, The New School for Social Research, and the London School of Economics, where he earned a PhD in Sociology and Geography.

Career

His books include Lockdown America: Police and Prisons in the Age of Crisis (2000), a survey of the rise of the prison-industrial complex from the Nixon through the Reagan Era and into the present, and The Soft Cage: Surveillance in America From Slavery to the War on Terror (2003), a study of surveillance and control in modern society. The Freedom: Shadows and Hallucinations in Occupied Iraq (2004), is an account of the US occupation of Iraq. In Tropic of Chaos: Climate Change and the New Geography of Violence (2011), Parenti links the implications of climate change with social and political unrest in mid-latitude regions of the world. Parenti has reported from Afghanistan, Iraq, Venezuela, Bolivia, the Ivory Coast and China, among other locations.

Parenti's reporting in Afghanistan was the subject of an award-winning HBO documentary, Fixer: The Taking of Ajmal Naqshbandi. Directed and edited by Ian Olds, the film follows the working relationship between Parenti and his Afghan colleague Ajmal Naqshbandi, and after Naqshbandi's capture and murder by the Taliban, Parenti's investigation of that crime.

Academics 
He was a visiting fellow at CUNY's Center for Place, Culture and Politics and a Soros Senior Justice Fellow. Parenti has taught at the New College of California and at St. Mary's College in Moraga, California. Parenti has also served as a professor of sustainable development at the SIT Graduate Institute. As of 2017, he is Associate Professor of Economics at John Jay College.

Personal life 
He divides his time between Brattleboro, Vermont, and New York City.

Books

 Lockdown America: Police and Prisons in the Age of Crisis (1999) 
 The Soft Cage: Surveillance in America From Slavery to the War on Terror (2003) 
 The Freedom: Shadows and Hallucinations in Occupied Iraq (2004) 
 Tropic of Chaos: Climate Change and the New Geography of Violence (2011) 
 Radical Hamilton: Economic Lessons from a Misunderstood Founder (2020)

See also
 Free the Slaves

References

External links
 
 

Living people
Alumni of the London School of Economics
New College of California
American foreign policy writers
American male non-fiction writers
American male journalists
American writers of Italian descent
American political writers
American investigative journalists
1969 births
Journalists from New York City
Buxton School (Massachusetts) alumni